Iliyan Mitsanski (born 20 December 1985) is a Bulgarian former professional footballer who played as a striker. He played 17 times for the Bulgaria national team.

Career

In Bulgaria
Mitsanski started his professional football career at Pirin 1922. In the 2004–05 season, he earned 29 appearances playing in the B PFG and scored 21 goals.

In June 2005, he moved to Polish club Amica Wronki.

In the first round of 2006–07 season he was loaned out to Korona Kielce, but was not able to reach the first squad there.

Zagłębie Lubin
In June 2008, Mitsanski transferred to Zagłębie Lubin. In the 2008–09 season, he became the top goalscorer for the team in the Polish First League with 26 goals, helping his team win promotion. During the next season he finished second goalscorer in the Polish league with 15 goals, just 2 goals behind  the Polish rising star Robert Lewandowski.

Kaiserslautern
On 18 June 2010, Mitsanski signed a four-year contract with 1. FC Kaiserslautern. On 24 July, he netted the only goal in the prestigious 1–0 win against Liverpool in a friendly match. On 22 September 2010, he made his official debut for his new team in the 0–5 away loss against Borussia Dortmund after coming on as a substitute for Erwin Hoffer. On 13 November 2010, he scored his first goal in the Bundesliga in the 3–3 home draw with VfB Stuttgart. He was unable to establish himself as a regular for the team and was loaned out to FSV Frankfurt during the winter break.

FSV Frankfurt
On 3 February 2012, Mitsanski made his debut for FSV Frankfurt and netted two goals in the 2–1 away win over MSV Duisburg in a 2. Bundesliga match.

Karlsruher SC
In June 2013, Mitsanski signed a contract with Karlsruher SC.

Levski Sofia
On 6 September 2016, Mitsanski made his return to Bulgarian football after 11 years abroad as he signed with PFC Levski Sofia until the end of the season.  He was released in January 2017.

Korona Kielce
On 1 February 2017, Mitsanski signed with Korona Kielce. In the following three months he scored three goals in eight league games. Mitsanski was not offered a contract extension and left the club in June 2017.

Slavia Sofia
After a year without a club, Mitsanski signed with Slavia Sofia on 28 September 2018. He left the club my mutual consent in December 2019.

International career
On 11 August 2010, Mitsanski made his debut for the Bulgarian national team in the 0–1 away loss against Russia in a friendly match. On 26 May 2012, he scored his first goal for the team against the Netherlands, which was a dramatic last-minute win. He scored his second international goal against Cyprus after coming off the substitutes bench in a friendly played on 15 August 2012.

On 9 September 2014, Mitsanski scored a goal for the 2–1 away win over Azerbaijan.

On 28 March 2015, he scored the second goal for the Bulgarian national team during the 2–2 draw with Italy. He was sent off on 6 September 2015, in the 0–1 away loss against Italy after a tussle with Daniele De Rossi.

Career statistics

Club

International

International goals

Honours
Polish Cup: Runner-up 2006–07

Individual
Bulgarian B Professional Football Group top scorer (21 goals)
I Liga top scorer 2008–09 (26 goals)
Ekstraklasa second top scorer (14 goals)

References

External links
 
 
 

1985 births
Living people
People from Sandanski
Association football forwards
Bulgarian footballers
Bulgarian expatriate footballers
PFC Pirin Blagoevgrad players
Amica Wronki players
Korona Kielce players
Lech Poznań players
Odra Wodzisław Śląski players
Zagłębie Lubin players
1. FC Kaiserslautern players
FSV Frankfurt players
FC Ingolstadt 04 players
Karlsruher SC players
Suwon Samsung Bluewings players
PFC Levski Sofia players
PFC Slavia Sofia players
First Professional Football League (Bulgaria) players
Second Professional Football League (Bulgaria) players
Ekstraklasa players
I liga players
Bundesliga players
2. Bundesliga players
K League 1 players
Bulgarian expatriate sportspeople in Poland
Bulgarian expatriate sportspeople in Germany
Bulgarian expatriate sportspeople in South Korea
Expatriate footballers in Poland
Expatriate footballers in Germany
Expatriate footballers in South Korea
Bulgaria international footballers
Sportspeople from Blagoevgrad Province